Estadio 25 de Noviembre is a multi-purpose stadium in Moquegua, Peru. It is currently used by football team San Simón de Moquegua. The stadium holds 21,000 people and was built in 2009. This will be one of the six venues in five cities for the 2019 FIFA U-17 World Cup.

References

External links
Stadium picture

Football venues in Peru
Multi-purpose stadiums in Peru
Sports venues completed in 2009
Estadio 25 de Noviembre